Chrysanthos, Latinized as Chrysanthus, is a Greek name meaning "golden flower". The feminine form of the name is Chrysanthe (Χρυσάνθη), also written Chrysanthi, Chrysanthy and Chrysanthea.

Notable people bearing this name include:

 Father Chrysanthus (1905–1972), Dutch priest and arachnologist
 Saint Chrysanthus, 3rd-century Christian martyr
 Chrysanthus (vicarius), Roman governor of Britain at the turn of the 4th century and bishop
 Chrysanthos of Madytos (c. 1770 – c. 1840), Greek musicologist
 Chrysanthos Sisinis (died 1845), participated in the Greek War of Independence
 Chrysanthos Sisinis (general), Greek general
 Archbishop Chrysanthus of Athens (1881–1949), Greek orthodox bishop, archbishop of Greece in 1938–41
 Chrysanthos Mentis Bostantzoglou (1918–1995), better known as Bost, Greek political cartoonist and playwright
 Chrysanthos Theodoridis, (1934–2005), Pontic Greek singer and songwriter
 Kim Tae-hun Chrysanthus, (1978-) 
 Chrysanthos Panayiotou, (1959 -), Greek American, Executive Director, Center for Laser and Fiber Optics Education, LASER-TEC

Greek masculine given names